Anglesey Airport  is an airport owned by the Isle of Anglesey County Council on land leased from the Defence Infrastructure Organisation. The airport is situated at Llanfair-yn-Neubwll in Anglesey, Wales. The leased site is part of RAF Valley.

History

Plans put forward in early 2006 by the National Assembly for Wales (now the Senedd) led to a subsidised weekday air service between the airport and Cardiff Airport, 12 miles west of the Welsh capital, in the hope of improving the economy of Anglesey and North Wales in general. A twice daily service began in May 2007 but was suspended in March 2020 and withdrawn in June 2022. The route was variously operated by Links Air, Citywing, and Eastern Airways (on behalf of Flybe until just prior to the flight's suspension in March 2020).

For residents of Anglesey, the air service was significantly quicker than surface transport. Gate-to-gate travel time to Cardiff was around one hour.

The passenger terminal is a single storey building consisting of a check-in desk, departure lounge and baggage handling areas as well as other visitor information areas. The terminal, completed in 2007, was designed by MAP architects and cost £1,000,000. The publicly funded building contract was given to the construction company Yorkon. The building was built off site and brought to the airport when finished.

The airport's principal stakeholders are RAF Valley, the Welsh Government, the Isle of Anglesey County Council and Cardiff Airport.  The airport is contract managed and operated by Bilfinger Europa Facility Management Limited, a UK subsidiary of Bilfinger, a publicly quoted enterprise on the German stock exchange. 

In March 2018, flights between Anglesey Airport and Cardiff Airport were suspended due to a fatal crash of a Hawk aircraft from the Red Arrows. Domestic flights were being diverted to Hawarden Airport in Flintshire with coaches transporting passengers between Valley and Hawarden.

Statistics

Source: UK Civil Aviation Authority

Ground transport
The airport is located less than two miles from the A55 North Wales Expressway linking Holyhead and Chester. The airport has a car park for passengers on the airport's former scheduled flights to Cardiff. Arriva Bus services link the airport to both  and Holyhead.

References

External links
Anglesey Airport (Isle of Anglesey County Council)
 Visit Anglesey website, for more info on Anglesey as a destination
RAF Valley

Transport in Anglesey
Airports in Wales
Llanfair-yn-Neubwll
Buildings and structures in Anglesey